Mohammad Asif Nang was appointed as the governor of Farah Province of Afghanistan on January 22, 2015.

Early life
Asif Nang was born on 1972 in Paktia Province of Afghanistan and is from the Sulaimankhel tribe. He graduated from Habibia High School in Kabul. He also completed his higher education in Pakistan and Saudi Arabia.

Work History
Asif Nang has served different posts at the Ministry of Education of Afghanistan. He was the Spokesman, Publications Officer, Public Relations Officer at the ministry. After dismissing the cabinet, President Ashraf Ghani appointed Nang as the acting minister for the Ministry of Education from 9 December 2014 to 21 January 2015. He fluently speaks Pashto, Dari, Arabic, Urdu and English languages.

Notes

Governors of Farah Province
Pashtun people
Living people
Afghan expatriates in Pakistan
People from Paktia Province
1972 births